Cyphenothrin is a synthetic pyrethroid insecticide.  It is effective against cockroaches that have developed resistance to organophosphorous and carbamate insecticides.

References

(cyano-(3-phenoxyphenyl)methyl) 2,2,3-trimethylcyclopropane-1-carboxylates
Chrysanthemate esters